Kahaimoelea was a Hawaiian chief, who ruled as the Aliʻi Nui of Hawaii from 1285 to 1315. He was the sovereign king or chief of the island of Hawaii. He is sometimes referred as Kahai IV or Kahiamoeleaikaaikupou.

Waipio Valley was first occupied as a royal residence by Kahaimoelea.

Kahaimoelea was a son of Chief Kalapana of Hawaiʻi by his wife, Lady Malamaʻihanaʻae. He followed his father as the sovereign of Hawaii and fathered Kalaunuiohua by his half-sister Kapoʻakaʻuluhailaʻa (Kapo-a-Kauluhailea).

References

Bibliography

General references 
 David Malo, Hawaiian Antiquities, Honolulu: Bishop Museum Press, 1951.
 Abraham Fornander, An Account of the Polynesian Race: Its Origin and Migrations, Rutland, VT: Charles E. Tuttle Company, 1969

Hawaiian chiefs
Year of birth missing
1315 deaths
House of Pili